Amy Corbett is a Scottish senior design manager and product lead at the Lego Group. She is most known as a judge (called "brickmaster") in the American television series Lego Masters.

Career
In 2008, Corbett spent three months assisting a non-government organization (NGO) in Botswana in the creation and implementation of sustainable projects. In 2011 she assisted with Engineers Without Borders (UK) to help the village coffee growers process their own crops.
She started working as design manager at the Lego Group in 2012. Corbett is responsible for developing new product lines. She worked on the Lego Friends line, a line that was launched when she arrived at the Lego Group. She also worked for the Lego Disney line. She was part of the concept team for the 2018 film The Lego Movie 2: The Second Part. Her current project with her design team is Lego DOTS, where they work to customize daily items like jewelry and picture frames.

In 2020, she started her role as judge “Brickmaster Amy” on the American edition of Lego Masters; a television reality show in which teams compete to build the best Lego project. In 2022, she also became a judge on the Christmas special episode of the British edition.

References

External links
 

1987 births
Mass media people from Glasgow
Scottish designers
Scottish women engineers
Lego people
Television judges
Women television personalities
Scottish television personalities
Living people